

The stamp seal is a carved object, usually stone, first made in the 4th millennium BC, and probably earlier.  They were used to impress their picture or inscription into soft, prepared clay.

Seal devices have seldom survived through time; it is usually only their impressions. A major exception are the cylinder seals made of stone, of which examples of their ancient impressions have survived as well, the majority being of clay tablets sealed as an authentication.

The Halaf culture saw the earliest known appearance of stamp seals in the Near East.

Indus stamp-seal

Different from the Minoan stamp-seals, the Indus stamp-seals probably have a different function from the stamp seals of the Minoan civilization, as they typically have script characters, with still undeciphered associations.

Gallery

See also
 Ancient Near Eastern seals and sealing practices
 Bulla (seal)
 Cylinder seal
 Impression seal
 Indus script
 LMLK seals from Lachish, ca 700 BCE.
 MMST
 Seal (emblem)
 Tell Halaf

References

 Garbini.  Landmarks of the World's Art, The Ancient World, by Giovanni Garbini, (McGraw-Hill Book Company, New York, Toronto), General Eds, Bernard S. Myers, New York, Trewin Copplestone, London, c 1966.  Numerous examples of the Cylinder seal; ( 3 ) separate Discussions (only) of "Stamp sealing".  No seals, or impressions thereof.
P. Yule, Early Cretan Seals: A Study of Chronology. Marburger Studien zur Vor und Frühgeschichte 4 (Mainz 1981), 
http://digi.ub.uni-heidelberg.de/diglit/yule1981/ Online

External links

Detail of Stamp seal-Medium Res;
Article mcclungmuseum.utk.edu—Jar, and associated Stamp Seal
Gazelle Head, Stamp seal – at the Oriental Institute of Chicago.

Seals (insignia)